Alcantarea heloisae is a plant species in the genus Alcantarea. This species is endemic to Brazil.

References

heloisae
Flora of Brazil